Tshiyab Ichichali is a rural locality (a selo) in Khasavyurtovsky District, Republic of Dagestan, Russia. The population was 2,272 as of 2010. There are 21 streets.

Geography 
Tshiyab Ichichali is located 19 km north of Khasavyurt (the district's administrative centre) by road. Siukh is the nearest rural locality.

References 

Rural localities in Khasavyurtovsky District